Caernarvon Athletic F.C. was a Welsh football team.

History
The club was formed after the Great War and until 1921 played in the North Wales Coast League and thereafter the Welsh National League (North) Division Two (West), with mixed fortune. In 1926, however, a limited company was formed and a full-time manager and professional team engaged. The club met with immediate success, winning the Welsh National League Division One championship in 1926–27, ahead of Bangor City and Rhyl, and repeating the feat in 1929–30 having been pipped to the title by Connah's Quay & Shotton 12 months earlier. Caernarvon Athletic are still remembered for their FA Cup run in 1929 when they defeated Darlington before going out to Bournemouth in a second round replay, the first game at the Oval attracting a crowd of some 9,000. In 1930, however, the club went into liquidation but two years later a re-formed team won the Welsh Combination before quitting over problems in using the Oval.

Honours
Welsh National League (North) Division One
Champions: 1926–27, 1929-30
Runners-up: 1928–29
Welsh National League (North) Division Two West
Runners-up: 1922–23

References

Defunct football clubs in Wales
Sport in Gwynedd
Caernarfon
Welsh National League (North) clubs
North Wales Coast League clubs
1919 establishments in Wales
Association football clubs established in 1919
1930 disestablishments in Wales
Association football clubs disestablished in 1930